Phytoene synthase (prephytoene-diphosphate synthase, 15-cis-phytoene synthase, PSase, geranylgeranyl-diphosphate geranylgeranyltransferase) is a transferase enzyme involved in the biosynthesis of carotenoids. It catalyzes the conversion of  geranylgeranyl pyrophosphate to phytoene. This enzyme catalyses the following chemical reaction

 2 geranylgeranyl diphosphate  15-cis-phytoene + 2 diphosphate (overall reaction)
(1a) 2 geranylgeranyl diphosphate  diphosphate + prephytoene diphosphate
(1b) prephytoene diphosphate  15-cis-phytoene + diphosphate

This enzyme requires Mn2+ for activity. It belongs to squalene/phytoene synthase family of proteins.

References 

EC 2.5.1